Eigi Kona (English: Stallone, My Pony) is a 2019 Indian Meitei language film directed by Bobby Wahengbam and Maipaksana Haorongbam and produced by Dr. K. Sushila Leima, under the banner of Luwang Apokpa Mamikol Productions. The film was premiered at Manipur State Film Development Society (MSFDS), Palace Compound in 2019. Eigi Kona was selected for Indian Panorama of the 51st International Film Festival of India (IFFI) 2020. The movie won the National Film Award for Best Feature Film in Manipuri at the 67th National Film Awards.

Eigi Kona got official selections at the Indica Film Utsav 2020, 4th Ottawa Indian Film Festival Awards (OIFFA) 2021 and Thrissur International Film Festival 2021.

The film was also screened at the 52nd International Film Festival of India 2021 under the section India@75. It was organized as a part of the ongoing celebrations to commemorate 75 years of India’s independence, Azadi Ka Amrit Mahotsav and 18 films were selected under the section.

Synopsis
Thawai, a young boy loves to play Polo riding Stallone, a pony. Like him, Stallone is descendant of the horse his famous grandfather rode on playing polo. Again, like him, horses are in shabby positions for want of food and shelter. His father can't help but to sell Stallone out of poverty where Thawai becomes sick with pangs of separation from the horse. Unable to see Thawai's suffering, all including the coach, mentor, and family members try to bring back the Stallone. The owner, who used to be a great polo player, finally hands over the pony to Thawai for the love of the game.

Cast 
 Sinam Shaolin as Thawai
 Prafullo Chandra as Ibopishak, Thawai's father
 Ayekpam Shanti as Ashangbi, Thawai's mother
 Leishangthem Tonthoi as Nganthoi
 Romesh Elangbam as Romesh
 Jasmin Elangbam as Latabi
 Sukanya Haorongbam as Bembem
 Chajing Deben as Latabi's father
 Angom Phiroj
 Berlin
 Surajlata
 Eigya Inaocha

Accolades
The movie won the National Film Award for Best Feature Film in Manipuri at the 67th National Film Awards. The citation for the National Award reads, "A thrilling film revealing the present plight and conditions of polo players and ponies in their place of origin."

Sinam Shaolin who plays the role of Thawai won the Best Child Artist award at the 13th Manipur State Film Awards 2020.

References

External links
 

2010s Meitei-language films
2019 films
Cinema of Manipur